Glass City Rollers (GCR) is a roller derby league based in Toledo, Ohio. Founded in 2007, the league currently consists of a single team which competes against teams from other leagues. Glass City is a member of the Women's Flat Track Derby Association (WFTDA).

History
Glass City was founded in 2007 by Jessica "Betty Floored" Crossfield and others. By late 2009, the league had twenty skaters, and it opened its first season in October by playing the Fox Cityz Foxz. The league later inspired the founding of the Sandusky Rollergirls.

Glass City was accepted into the Women's Flat Track Derby Association Apprentice Program in April 2010, and became a full member of the WFTDA in March 2012.

WFTDA rankings

References

Sports in Toledo, Ohio
Roller derby leagues established in 2007
Roller derby leagues in Ohio
Women's Flat Track Derby Association Division 3
2007 establishments in Ohio